Francesco Maria Scelloni, O.F.M. was a Roman Catholic prelate who served as Bishop of Viterbo e Tuscania (1472–1491) and twice as Bishop of Terni (1472 and 1491–1494).

Biography
Francesco Maria Scelloni was ordained a priest in the Order of Friars Minor.
On 14 February 1472, he was appointed by Pope Sixtus IV as Bishop of Terni.
His position was short-lived as on 31 August 1472, he was appointed by Pope Sixtus IV as Bishop of Viterbo e Tuscania.
In 1491, he was again appointed by Pope Innocent VIII as Bishop of Terni.
It is uncertain how long he served although the next bishop of record was Giovanni di Fonsalida who was appointed on 1 October 1494.

References

External links and additional sources
 (for Chronology of Bishops) 
 (for Chronology of Bishops) 
 (for Chronology of Bishops) 
 (for Chronology of Bishops) 

15th-century Italian Roman Catholic bishops
Year of birth unknown
Bishops appointed by Pope Sixtus IV
Bishops appointed by Pope Innocent VIII